The San Antonio Armadillos were a women's professional softball team based in San Antonio, Texas.  They were part of the founding roster of National Pro Fastpitch teams in 2004.

History

The Armadillos's owner was Suzi Stauffer.  The Armadillos were assigned to the NPF's West Division, along with the Colorado Altitude, Arizona Heat, and California Sunbirds.  The East Division included NY/NJ Juggernaut, New England Riptide, Akron Racers and Texas Thunder.

The team announced in February that they had an agreement to lease San Antonio Independent School District's Spring Sports Complex for their games.

Veteran softball coach Phil Koehler was named the Armadillos' coach, to be assisted by Charles Dismuke of the San Antonio Fastpitch Academy and former Texas A&M softball player Gina Perez.  By 2015, Koehler had more than 35 years of softball coaching, including 1989-96 as head coach of St. Edward's University

In March 2004, NPF released its inaugural schedule for the year and did not include the Armadillos and the Altitude.  Sources reported that NPF felt the San Antonio ownership ""came in late and really just couldn't get everything together in time," while Stauffer, calling the process a "nightmare," claimed she had a stadium and sponsors signed up, but NPF doubted her ability to support the team and increased her fee substantially, on top of a dispute over whether the league owned the team name and logos.

Shortly thereafter, a letter of the team's website indicated that the Armadillos, with new owners, would apply to be an NPF expansion team in 2005.  However, the only 2005 expansion team was the Chicago Bandits, and after the Texas Thunder moved to Rockford, Illinois, the NPF would not have a team in Texas until the Dallas Charge began play in 2015.

Players
The Armadillos participated in NPF's inaugural Elite Draft and Senior Draft.  The following players were drafted by the Armadillos:

The following players also appeared on the team's roster, acquired via means other the draft (free agency, trade):

References

External links 
 
 The Softball Channel

Defunct sports teams in Texas
Sports teams in San Antonio
Defunct softball teams in the United States
Defunct National Pro Fastpitch teams
Sports clubs established in 2004
Sports clubs disestablished in 2004
2004 establishments in Texas
2004 disestablishments in Texas
Women's sports in Texas